The year 1979 was marked by many events that left an imprint on the history of Soviet and Russian Fine Arts.

Events
 Spring Exhibition of works by Leningrad artists was opened in the Leningrad Union of Artists.
 Exhibition of works by Yuri Neprintsev dedicated to 70th Anniversary was opened in the Museum of the Academy of Arts of the USSR in Leningrad.
 Exhibition of works by Gevork Kotiantz was opened in the Leningrad Union of Artists.
 Exhibition of works by Alexander Lubimov (1879–1955) dedicated to 100-years Anniversary was opened in the Leningrad Union of Artists.

Deaths
 February 23 — Mikhail Natarevich, soviet painter (b. 1907).

See also

 List of Russian artists
 List of painters of Leningrad Union of Artists
 Saint Petersburg Union of Artists
 Russian culture

References

Sources
 Всесоюзная художественная выставка «Голубые дороги Родины». Каталог. М., Советский художник, 1979.
 Непринцев Юрий Михайлович. Каталог выставки. К 70-летию со дня рождения и 50-летию творческой деятельности. Л., Искусство, 1979.
 Выставка произведений молодых ленинградских художников "60 лет ВЛКСМ". Каталог. Л., Художник РСФСР, 1982.
 Геворк Вартанович Котьянц. Выставка произведений. Каталог. Л., Художник РСФСР, 1979.
 Георгий Павлович Татарников. Выставка произведений. Каталог. Л., Художник РСФСР, 1979.
 Николай Иванович Костров. Выставка произведений. Каталог. Л., Художник РСФСР, 1979.
 Анна Александровна Кострова. Выставка произведений. Каталог. Л., Художник РСФСР, 1979.
 Белокуров Константин Сергеевич. Выставка произведений. Каталог. Л., Художник РСФСР, 1979.
 Artists of Peoples of the USSR. Biography Dictionary. Vol. 1. Moscow, Iskusstvo, 1970.
 Artists of Peoples of the USSR. Biography Dictionary. Vol. 2. Moscow, Iskusstvo, 1972.
 Directory of Members of Union of Artists of USSR. Volume 1,2. Moscow, Soviet Artist Edition, 1979.
 Directory of Members of the Leningrad branch of the Union of Artists of Russian Federation. Leningrad, Khudozhnik RSFSR, 1980.
 Artists of Peoples of the USSR. Biography Dictionary. Vol. 4 Book 1. Moscow, Iskusstvo, 1983.
 Directory of Members of the Leningrad branch of the Union of Artists of Russian Federation. - Leningrad: Khudozhnik RSFSR, 1987.
 Artists of peoples of the USSR. Biography Dictionary. Vol. 4 Book 2. - Saint Petersburg: Academic project humanitarian agency, 1995.
 Link of Times: 1932 - 1997. Artists - Members of Saint Petersburg Union of Artists of Russia. Exhibition catalogue. - Saint Petersburg: Manezh Central Exhibition Hall, 1997.
 Matthew C. Bown. Dictionary of 20th Century Russian and Soviet Painters 1900-1980s. - London: Izomar, 1998.
 Vern G. Swanson. Soviet Impressionism. - Woodbridge, England: Antique Collectors' Club, 2001.
 Петр Фомин. Живопись. Воспоминания современников. СПб., 2002. С.107.
 Время перемен. Искусство 1960—1985 в Советском Союзе. СПб., Государственный Русский музей, 2006.
 Sergei V. Ivanov. Unknown Socialist Realism. The Leningrad School. - Saint-Petersburg: NP-Print Edition, 2007. - , .
 Anniversary Directory graduates of Saint Petersburg State Academic Institute of Painting, Sculpture, and Architecture named after Ilya Repin, Russian Academy of Arts. 1915 - 2005. - Saint Petersburg: Pervotsvet Publishing House, 2007.

Art
Soviet Union